Feay Inn is a historic inn located at Wheeling, Ohio County, West Virginia.  It was built about 1811, and is a -story I house-style fieldstone building.  It was built to take advantage of the traffic using the National Road.

It was listed on the National Register of Historic Places in 1993.

References

External links

Buildings and structures in Wheeling, West Virginia
Hotel buildings on the National Register of Historic Places in West Virginia
Hotel buildings completed in 1811
National Register of Historic Places in Wheeling, West Virginia
I-houses in West Virginia
Stone houses in West Virginia